Rhyacodrilus is a genus of annelids belonging to the family Naididae.

The genus has cosmopolitan distribution.

Species:
 Rhyacodrilus abyssalis
 Rhyacodrilus alcyoneus Rodriguez & Fend, 2013

References

Naididae